Lyons is a city in and the county seat of Rice County, Kansas, United States.  As of the 2020 census, the population of the city was 3,611.

History

For millennia, the land now known as Kansas was inhabited by Native Americans.

Although Coronado's exact route across the plains is uncertain and has been widely disputed, his men and he  are thought to have camped near the present location of Lyons on their quest for Quivira, a Native American place that Indians to the southwest had told them was fabulously wealthy in gold.

West of Lyons is a cross commemorating Juan de Padilla, a member of Coronado's expedition, who returned the following year as a missionary.  He was killed in 1542 by Native Americans after establishing a church in the area, and is considered the first Christian martyr in North America.

In 1803, most of modern Kansas was secured by the United States as part of the Louisiana Purchase.

Lyons Main Street (U.S. Highway 56) is based on the Santa Fe Trail.

In 1854, the Kansas Territory was organized, then in 1861 Kansas became the 34th U.S. state.  In 1867, Rice County was founded.

Lyons was originally called Atlanta, and under the latter name was founded in 1870. It was renamed Lyons in 1876, in honor of Freeman J. Lyons.

In 1878, Atchison, Topeka and Santa Fe Railway and parties from Marion County and McPherson County chartered the Marion and McPherson Railway Company. In 1879, a branch line was built from Florence to McPherson, in 1880, it was extended to Lyons, and in 1881, it was extended to Ellinwood. The line was leased and operated by the Atchison, Topeka and Santa Fe Railway. The line from Florence to Marion, was abandoned in 1968. In 1992, the line from Marion to McPherson was sold to Central Kansas Railway. In 1993, after heavy flood damage, the line from Marion to McPherson was abandoned. The original branch line connected Florence, Marion, Canada, Hillsboro, Lehigh, Canton, Galva, McPherson, Conway, Windom, Little River, Mitchell, Lyons, Chase, and Ellinwood.

Lyons was incorporated as a city in 1880, the same year the railroad was built through it.

In 1890, the Western Salt Company put down its first shaft to mine salt in Lyons.

In the 1970s, the federal government was interested in using a local site for the burial of high-level nuclear waste.

Geography
Lyons is located at  (38.344962, -98.202493).

Climate
According to the Köppen climate classification, Lyons has a humid continental climate, Dfa on climate maps.

Demographics

2010 census
As of the census of 2010, there were 3,739 people, 1,503 households, and 952 families living in the city. The racial makeup of the city was 85.7% White, 1.3% African American, 0.9% Native American, 0.4% Asian, 0.1% Pacific Islander, 7.9% from other races, and 3.8% from two or more races. Hispanic or Latino of any race were 20.3% of the population.

There were 1,503 households, of which 31.3% had children under the age of 18 living with them, 49.0% were married couples living together, 8.6% had a female householder with no husband present, 5.7% had a male householder with no wife present, and 36.7% were non-families. 32.1% of all households were made up of individuals, and 16.4% had someone living alone who was 65 years of age or older. The average household size was 2.42 and the average family size was 3.04.

The median age in the city was 38.2 years. 25.8% of residents were under the age of 18; 9.1% were between the ages of 18 and 24; 22.5% were from 25 to 44; 23.8% were from 45 to 64; and 18.9% were 65 years of age or older. The gender makeup of the city was 49.0% male and 51.0% female.

2000 census
As of the census of 2000, there were 3,732 people, 1,546 households, and 1,032 families living in the city. The racial makeup of the city was 91.16% White, 1.96% African American, 0.75% Native American, 0.32% Asian, 0.11% Pacific Islander, 3.75% from other races, and 1.96% from two or more races. Hispanic or Latino of any race were 12.03% of the population.

There were 1,546 households, out of which 31.6% had children under the age of 18 living with them, 54.3% were married couples living together, 8.5% had a female householder with no husband present, and 33.2% were non-families. 30.7% of all households were made up of individuals, and 18.0% had someone living alone who was 65 years of age or older. The average household size was 2.39 and the average family size was 2.96.

In the city, the population was spread out, with 26.5% under the age of 18, 7.9% from 18 to 24, 24.7% from 25 to 44, 20.9% from 45 to 64, and 19.9% who were 65 years of age or older. The median age was 39 years. For every 100 females, there were 93.2 males. For every 100 females age 18 and over, there were 89.4 males.

The median income for a household in the city was $32,945, and the median income for a family was $39,639. Males had a median income of $30,765 versus $17,778 for females. The per capita income for the city was $16,206. About 9.1% of families and 11.3% of the population were below the poverty line, including 16.0% of those under age 18 and 8.1% of those age 65 or over.

Economics
Lyons Salt Company and Compass Minerals is located on the southeast side of Lyons.

Education
The community is served by Lyons USD 405 public school district.

Notable people
Notable individuals who were born in and/or have lived in Lyons include:
 William Borah (1865-1940), U.S. Senator from Idaho
 Marshall Christmann (1976- ), Kansas state legislator
 James Fankhauser (1939- ), conductor, singer
 Orville Harrold (1878-1933), actor, opera singer
 Shirley Knight (1938-2020), Hollywood actress
 James Pulliam (1925-2005), architect
 Marcia Rodd (1940- ), actress
 Jerry Cox Vasconcells (1892-1950), U.S. Army captain, World War I flying ace
 Milton R. Wolf (1971- ), radiologist, Kansas politician

See also
 National Register of Historic Places listings in Rice County, Kansas
 Santa Fe Trail

References

Further reading

External links
 

 City of Lyons
 Lyons - Directory of Public Officials
 , from Hatteberg's People on KAKE TV news
 Lyons city map, KDOT

Cities in Kansas
County seats in Kansas
Cities in Rice County, Kansas
1870 establishments in Kansas
Populated places established in 1870